Sofie Eriksson (born 1992) is a Swedish politician. She was elected as Member of the Riksdag in September 2022. She represents the constituency of Dalarna County. She is affiliated with the Social Democrats.

References 

Living people
1992 births
Place of birth missing (living people)
21st-century Swedish politicians
21st-century Swedish women politicians
Members of the Riksdag 2022–2026
Members of the Riksdag from the Social Democrats
Women members of the Riksdag